The Kerala Co-operative Milk Marketing Federation (KCMMF), known by its trade name Milma,   is a state government cooperative society established in 1980 headquartered in Thiruvananthapuram. It is a state government cooperative owned by the Ministry of Cooperation, Government of Kerala.  KCMMF is a Federation of Regional three Regional Milk Unions: the ERCMPU, TRCMPU and MRCMPU. 

It follows a cooperative structure and is one of the most profitable cooperatives in Kerala. In 1983, it took over the production and milk marketing facilities under the Kerala Livestock and Milk Marketing Board. The board was later renamed as Kerala Livestock Development Board.

History
In the early 1980s, Kerala was seen as a dairy unfriendly State and had to depend primarily on the neighboring States for its milk supply. However, today, Kerala is almost self-sufficient in milk production.

Established in 1980 as the implementing agency for Operation Flood II in the State of Kerala.

The Organisation has a three-tier structure with the primary milk Cooperative societies at the village level, Regional Milk Producers’ Unions at the middle level and an apex body at the State level which is the Kerala Cooperative Milk Marketing Federation Ltd. There are three Regional Cooperative Milk Producers’ Unions operating at present. The revenue districts of Thiruvananthapuram, Kollam, Alappuzha, and Pathanamthitta come under the jurisdiction of the Thiruvananthapuram Regional Cooperative Milk Producers’ Union (TRCMPU), the districts of Ernakulam, Thrissur, Kottayam and Idukki under the Ernakulam Regional Cooperative Milk Producers’ Union (ERCMPU) and the six northern districts of Palakkad, Kannur, Malappuram, Kozhikkode, Wayanad and Kasaragod under the Malabar Regional Cooperative Milk Producers Union (MRCMPU). The three-tier structure ensures that the farmer members are directly responsible for policy-level decisions for the marketing of their produce.

The farmer memberships which stood at 45,000 during takeover of dairies from the erstwhile Kerala Livestock Development & Milk Marketing Board during 1983 has grown to over 9.0 lakhs (Aprox 3 Lakhs pouring members) through 3,600 milk Cooperatives by the end of 2017-'18. Similarly, milk procurement has also shown a phenomenal growth from 52,000 litres per day during 1983 to over 12,25,000 litres per day in 2017-'18.

Keeping pace with the development of milk procurement and sale, Milma has concentrated on infrastructural development with financial assistance from the National Dairy Development Board, Swiss Development Cooperation and other agencies. As on date, there are 13 milk processing plants with a combined processing capacity of 12.50 lakh litres per day with further expansion envisaged and 8 Milk Chilling Plants scattered across the State. A Milk Powder Plant has a capacity for production of 10 MT of milk powder per day and two cattle feed plants, one at Pattanakkad (300 MTPD) and other at Malampuzha (300 MTPD). The Pellet cattle feed manufactured in these plants are well accepted by the Dairy farmers and in the open market.
K S Mani is the new Chairman of Kerala Cooperative Milk Marketing federation (MILMA).

See also
Bihar State Milk Co-operative Federation
Karnataka Milk Federation
Odisha State Cooperative Milk Producers' Federation

References 

Companies based in Thiruvananthapuram
Dairy products companies of India
Indian companies established in 1980
Cooperatives in Kerala
Food and drink companies established in 1980
Dairy cooperatives in India
1980 establishments in Kerala